The 2020 Toledo Rockets football team represented the University of Toledo during the 2020 NCAA Division I FBS football season. The Rockets were led by fifth-year head coach Jason Candle and played their home games at the Glass Bowl in Toledo, Ohio. They competed as members of the West Division of the Mid-American Conference (MAC).

Schedule
Toledo had a game scheduled against Michigan State on September 19, which was canceled due to the COVID-19 pandemic.
On August 8, 2020, the Mid-American Conference announced a cancellation of the fall football season, citing health and safety concerns due to the COVID-19 pandemic. The announcement also stated the intention for the conference to attempt to play the season in spring instead, as opposed to completely cancelling the 2020 season.

References

Toledo
Toledo Rockets football seasons
Toledo Rockets football